Cruentus is a Polish industrial metal band, with djent and progressive metal influences, formed in Szczecin, in 1999.

Members
 Marcin "Hyeev" Galicki – vocals (since 2007)
 Jakub "KRN" Lasota – bass guitar, production, synthesizer (since 1999)
 Tomasz "Archangel" Gabryel – guitar, production (since 1999)
 Robert "Binar" Gregorczuk – synthesizer, keyboards (since 2000)
 Michał "Alvaro" Waliszewski – guitar (since 2010)
 Bartłomiej "Bart" Mieżyński - drums (since 2009)

Discography

Demos
 Manifestation of Contemporary Universal Dementia (2000)
 Dismal Vortex (2002)
 Universal Dementia (2002)
 Technological Symphony (2004)

Albums
 Event Horizon (2004, 22 Records)
 Audition of Your Modern Nitemare (EP, 2006)
 Terminal Code (2010, Music Net)
 Every Tomorrow (2018)

References

Polish heavy metal musical groups
Musical groups established in 1999
1999 establishments in Poland